Jan Havlíček is a Czech slalom canoeist who has competed since the mid-2000s. Since 2010 he has been competing in C-2 together with Lukáš Přinda.

He won a silver medal in the C-2 team event at the 2010 ICF Canoe Slalom World Championships in Tacen. He also won two gold medals in the same event at the European Championships.

References
2010 ICF Canoe Slalom World Championships 11 September 2010 C-2 men's team final results. - accessed 11 September 2010.

Czech male canoeists
Living people
Year of birth missing (living people)
Medalists at the ICF Canoe Slalom World Championships